The Brenno is a  long river in canton Ticino in Switzerland. It drains most of the Blenio Valley and it joins the Ticino River between Pollegio and Biasca.

Rivers of Ticino
Rivers of Switzerland